Pillow Ridge is a ridge of the Tahltan Highland in northern British Columbia, Canada, located southeast of Telegraph Creek. It extends northwest from Mount Edziza in Mount Edziza Provincial Park.

History
As its name suggests, Pillow Ridge was named on January 2, 1980 by the Geological Survey of Canada for the classic exposures of subaqueous pillow lava that form the ridge.

Geology
Pillow Ridge is a volcanic feature associated with the Mount Edziza volcanic complex which in turn form part of the Northern Cordilleran Volcanic Province. It is a subglacial mound that formed in the Pleistocene period when this area was buried beneath glacial ice during the last ice age.

See also
 List of volcanoes in Canada
 List of Northern Cordilleran volcanoes
 Volcanism of Canada
 Volcanism of Western Canada

References

Subglacial mounds of Canada
Mount Edziza volcanic complex
Ridges of British Columbia
Ridges of Canada
Pleistocene volcanoes
Monogenetic volcanoes
Two-thousanders of British Columbia